Joshua Karp, better known by his stage name Budo, is an American musician, multi-instrumentalist, and record producer. He is a member of A.R.M. along with M.anifest and Krukid. He is one half of the duo Roger Lion along with Joe Pernice.

Life and career
In 2005, Budo produced tracks for Macklemore's The Language of My World. In 2008, he released a collaborative album with Grieves, titled 88 Keys & Counting. In 2011, he produced tracks for Grieves' album, Together/Apart.

In 2013, Budo released a collaborative single with Grynch, titled "Treadin'", on Fin Records. In that year, he released the solo album, The Finger & the Moon.

Discography

Studio albums
 Civilized (2005) 
 88 Keys & Counting (2008) 
 One Bird on a Wire (2009)
 The Finger & the Moon (2013)
 Roger Lion (2015)

EPs
 Daylight (2009)
 Two Africans and a Jew EP Vol. 1 (2010)

Singles
 "Treadin'" (2013)

Productions
 Macklemore - "White Privilege", "Claiming the City", "Inhale Deep", "I Say Hey", "The Magic", "Love Song", "Remember High School", "Contradiction", and "My Language" from The Language of My World (2005)
 M.anifest - "Born Free", "How I Used to Be", "Hubris", "Just Like a Lion", and "Ghana, 52" from The Birds & the Beats (2009)
 Prometheus Brown & Bambu - "Rashida Jones" from Walk into a Bar (2011)
 Onry Ozzborn - "The Getaway Car" and "Limbo Thus Purgatory" from Hold On for Dear Life (2011)
 Grieves - "Light Speed", "Bloody Poetry", "Falling from You", "Tragic", "Boogie Man", "No Matter What", "Vice Grip", "Speak Easy", "Prize Fighter", and "Against the Bottom" from Together/Apart (2011)
 Luckyiam - "Epiphany" from Time to Get Lucky (2012)
 Sol - "The Rundown" and "Budo's Interlude" from Yours Truly (2012)
 Time - "Auto Bio" from Newstalgia (2013)
 The MC Type - "The Ex Laws" from Bad Tattoos Volume 2 (2013)
 Griff J - "Better Late", "To Each Their Own", "Chase What You Want", "Burning Out", and "Home" from After the Starting Gun (2013)
 Dessa - "Warsaw (Budo Remix)" from Parts of Speech, Re-Edited (2014)
 Macklemore - "Glorious", "Marmalade", "Willy Wonka", "Intentions", "Good Old Days", "Levitate", "Firebreather", "Ten Million", "Church", and "Excavate" from Gemini (2017)
 Doja Cat - "Candy" from Amala (2018)

References

External links
 
 

Living people
Year of birth missing (living people)
American hip hop record producers
American multi-instrumentalists
Musicians from Seattle